The fire-tailed rainbow-skink (Lygisaurus parrhasius) is a species of skink found in Queensland in Australia.

References

Lygisaurus
Reptiles described in 1994
Skinks of Australia
Endemic fauna of Australia
Taxa named by Patrick J. Couper
Taxa named by Jeanette Covacevich
Taxa named by P.J. Lethbridge